{{Infobox weapon
| name               = FB MSBS Grot 5.56
| image              = MSB (standard).png
| caption            = MSBS Grot assault rifle
| type               = Assault rifle
| service            = 
| wars               = 2022 Russian invasion of Ukraine
| designer           = Adam Gawron, Bartosz Stefaniak, Grzegorz Misiołek, Maciej Sajdak
| design_date        = 2007
| production_date    = 2007–2017 (prototypes)2018–present
| number             = 
| spec_label         = 
| length             =  (MSBS Grot C, stock extended) (MSBS Grot B)
| action             = Short-stroke gas piston, rotating bolt
| image_size         = 300
| origin             = Poland
| is_ranged          = Yes
| used_by            = See Users
| manufacturer       = FB "Łucznik" Radom
| variants           = See Variants
| weight             =  (MSBS Grot C) (MSBS Grot B) (MSBS Grot 762N)
| part_length        = 

| width              = 
| cartridge          = 5.56×45mm NATO7,62x51 mm7.62×39mm 
| rate               = 700–900 rounds/min
| velocity           = 890 m/s
| range              = 
| feed               = 30-round detachable STANAG magazines, 60-round casket magazine (5.56×45mm NATO)
| sights             = Integrated Picatinny rail for various optical sights and Picatinny attachable iron sights
}}
The FB Radom MSBS Grot is a modular assault rifle developed and manufactured by FB "Łucznik" Radom.

There are two basic variants of the rifle: a conventional layout assault rifle and a bullpup. The MSBS is the first machine carbine fully designed and produced completely in Poland since World War II as well as the largest firearms sale contract taken on by the Polish arms industry since 1989.

History

The MSBS rifle was in development since 2007 by the Military University of Technology (WAT) in Warsaw with cooperation from the firearms manufacturer FB Radom, and was designed to replace the FB Beryl rifle used by the Polish military since 1997.

During initial tests conducted by the Military University of Technology, the MSBS rifle and its counterpart HK416 were subjected to comparative testing of the barrel and hand-guard for overheating during an intensive firing schedule. According to the tests, MSBS yielded the better results of the two rifles despite having a relatively light and longer barrel profile. Additional tests have also shown that MSBS is less susceptible to jamming when using lower quality ammunition or when it is insufficiently maintained, and had a more manageable recoil when fired in full-auto compared to other assault rifles chambered in the 5.56 cartridge, such as FB Beryl, HK416, FN SCAR-L or CZ BREN 2.

One of the main design characteristics of the MSBS rifle is the modular weapon system. If necessary, a soldier can sacrifice, for example, one standard assault rifle to quickly repair a light machine gun during a firefight. Another feature of the rifle is barrel changeability, as found on the Steyr AUG. This means a soldier may be able to adapt their rifle based on the environment they are in, such as converting a carbine to a designated marksman rifle, in order to engage targets at a greater range. The benefits of this feature allow an infantry squad to have fewer specialised weapons. MSBS may also be used with components other than the ones manufactured domestically, and it is the first Polish rifle fully compliant with the NATO standards. The MSBS rifle features fully ambidextrous controls and Picatinny rail, and it may also be fed from standard STANAG magazines.

Currently, the rifle is in service with the Polish Territorial Defence Forces and is scheduled to replace FB Beryl as the primary infantry weapon and service rifle of the Polish Armed Forces. Following the adoption of the rifle by the Polish military, the Grot moniker has been added to the MSBS name in honor of the Home Army commander, General Stefan "Grot" Rowecki.

During the 2022 Russian invasion of Ukraine 10,000 Grot C16A2 rifles were sent to the Ukrainian military.

On May 9, 2022, the public was informed about the conclusion of an agreement between the Polish Armaments Group and an undefined East African country for the supply of an unspecified number of MSBS Grot assault rifles chambered for 7.62 × 39 mm rounds as specified by the customer, along with 40 mm grenade launchers and optical sights DCM-1 Szafir  manufactured by PCO S.A.

Variants

The following variants were designed based on the requests from the Polish Armed Forces to replace currently used firearms such as the AKM, FB Beryl, FB Mini-Beryl, and Pallad grenade launcher.

 MSBS Grot C is the classic variant of the rifle chambered in either 5.56×45mm NATO cartridge with a folding and retractable stock.
 MSBS-5,56A0 - initial production, 1,000 produced.
 FB-M1 (MSBS-5,56A1) - first production batch: modified charging handle and additional strap mount point on the picatinny rail.
 FB-M2 (MSBS-5,56A2) - second production batch: longer handguard to cover the gas block, reinforced firing pin for dry fire practice, improved pistol grip and buttstock.
 MSBS Grot B – the bullpup variant of the rifle chambered in 5.56×45mm NATO cartridge.
 MSBS Grot 762N  – semi-automatic marksman rifle cal. 7.62x51 mm in two versions, with a barrel length of 20 and 16 inches
 MSBS Grot R – is the representative variant of the rifle designed to be used by honour guards which has been adapted to fire blanks and withstand drills. With the modularity of the rifle, the barrel can be swapped to fire live ammunition.
 Grot S – civilian semi-auto version without bayonet-mount, available with 4 variants of barrels (2022): 10.5, 14.5, and 16 inch in .223 Remington and 16 inch in 7.62×39mm.

The MSBS GROT is a selective fire modular assault rifle which is capable of semi-automatic, 3-round burst and fully automatic fire. It has a cyclic rate of fire of around 700–900 rounds per minute.

Both the Classic and Bullpup variants are planned in 5 different configurations and have many common interchangeable parts and can be in future converted from one to the other.:

Assault rifle – a standard assault rifle configuration with  barrel.
Assault rifle with underbarrel grenade launcher – similar to the assault rifle configuration but with a 40×46mm underbarrel grenade launcher equipped.
Carbine – a short barrel variant with a  barrel.
Carbine with underbarrel grenade launcher – similar to the carbine configuration but with a 40×46mm underbarrel grenade launcher equipped.
Squad automatic weapon – a variant equipped with a heavy profile  barrel.
Designated marksman rifle – fitted with a 16 in (410 mm) and 20 in (508 mm) barrel and a two stage trigger group.

Currently only conventional layout assault rifle, carbine, representational and semi-auto versions are available. Bullpup layout, grenade launcher, squad automatic weapon and designated marksman rifle are not produced. Modules for conversion between versions also are not available. Conversions kit to caliber 7.62×39mm is available.

Since the Polish ministry of defence ordered 53,000 of the MSBS assault rifles, Fabryka Broni has introduced a military naming designation for the MSBS series.

Grot – After the official adoption of the rifle by the Polish Armed Forces, the Grot name was added.

C, B, R, S – variants: classic, bullpup, representative, sport (semi-auto civilian)

10, 14, 16, 20 – barrel lengths, in inches.

G, M, PS – configurations: assault rifle with grenade launcher, light machine gun, marksman rifle

FB – Fabryka Broni, the manufacturer of this weapon system.

M(x) – number of series (x stands for the generation, for examples, M1 means first generation, M2 is second generation, M3 is planned third generation).

Grot 762N is a semi-automatic designated marksman rifle chambered in 7.62×51mm NATO cartridge.

The MSBS-7.62N project began in the end of 2015 when Polish Military of Defence announced analytical works for the replacement program of their SVD Dragunov marksman rifle and supplement the bolt-action TRG-22 and Tor sniper rifles currently in service. It was led by the team of Fabryka Broni Łucznik-Radom and Wojskowa Akademia Techniczna (WAT) engineers.

The MSBS-7.62N has two different configurations; one with a 508 mm (20 in) barrel with a fixed adjustable stock and the other with 406 mm (16 in) barrel with the MSBS Grot C's adjustable side-folding stock. Both configurations are part of the MSBS family and some of the parts of the rifle, such as the stock, handguard, pistol grip, and trigger are interchangeable between 5.56m and 7.62m models.

The MSBS-7.62N is designed as a semi-automatic rifle but project engineers declared that a fully automatic configuration can be developed if required.

Users
: 184,000 planned by 2026.Kolejne karabinki automatyczne GROT i nowe karabiny wyborowe GROT 762N dla Sił Zbrojnych RP z NBPWP Borsuk w tle.
Territorial Defence Force: ~53,000 in 2017.
Polish Armed Forces
: 10,000 Grot C16A2 rifles sent to the Ukrainian Ground Forces during the 2022 Russian invasion of Ukraine.

 See also 

 Remington ACR

References

Other sources
  Pierwszy pokaz MSBS-5,56 in: Altair, 12 December 2009
  Nowa polska broń – MSBS-5,56 in: Altair, 15 December 2009
  MSBS-5,56 już strzela in: Altair, 16 December 2009
  Rodzina MSBS-5.56 W Czerwcu in: Altair, 22 March 2010
  Nowy MSBS-5,56 in: Altair, 9 August 2010
  MSBS-5,56 w nowej szacie in: Altair, 5 October 2010
  Giwera przyszłości in: Polska zbrojna, 30 December 2008
  MSBS-5,56 w Pułtusku in: Altair, 4 June 2011
  MSBS do amunicji 7,62mm x 39 in: Altair, 21 September 2014
  Prototypy karabinów MSBS-7,62 na MSPO'' in Altair, 9 January 2016

External links
Fabryka Broni "Łucznik" Radom home page 

5.56×45mm NATO assault rifles
7.62×39mm assault rifles
7.62×51mm NATO battle rifles
Assault rifles of Poland
Bullpup rifles
Military equipment introduced in the 2010s